James Patton may refer to:

James Patton (Virginia colonist) (1692-1755) Irish immigrant who lived in colonial Virginia
James French Patton (1843–1882), American soldier and judge
Jimmy Patton (1933–1972), American football player
Jim Patton (brewer) (1953–2012), American anthropologist and craft beer brewer
James L. Patton (born 1941), American mammalogist
James Patton (defensive lineman) (born 1970), American football player
James Patton (American football coach), American football player and coach
James Patton (baseball), American baseball player
James Patton (politician) (1780–1830), Lieutenant Governor of Mississippi
James D. Patton (1850–1925), American politician in the Virginia House of Delegates

See also
James "Squire" Patton House, historic house in New Windsor, New York
James Paton (disambiguation)
James A. Patten (1852–1928), American financier and grain merchant